Marco Polo is a 2007 American made-for-television historical adventure drama film directed by Kevin Connor, starring Ian Somerhalder, BD Wong and Brian Dennehy. In the 13th Century, imprisoned in Genoa, Marco Polo, a Venetian trader, recounts his days as a young man in China to a fellow prisoner who is dying. He reminisces about his fantastic adventures, his rise to governorship in Kublai Khan's court in Mongolia, his love for a kidnapped concubine and his escape back to Italy as a wealthy man.

Cast
 Ian Somerhalder as Marco Polo
 BD Wong as Pedro
 Desiree Ann Siahaan as Temulun / Kensai
 Brian Dennehy as Kublai Khan
 Lim Kay Tong as Lord Chenchu
 Christian Lee as Cogatai
 Yan Luo as Chabi
 Michael Chow as Chi
 Mark Jax as Niccolo Polo
 Alan Shearman as Maffeo Polo
 Michael O'Hagan as Old Marco Polo
 Ramin Razaghi Sefati as Persian Physician (credited as Rumin Razagh)
 Jiaolong Sun as Chonggu (credited as Sun Jiao Long)
 Zi Ge Fang as Achmath (credited as Fang Ge)
 Rodger Bumpass as Rustigielo
 Baljinnyamyn Amarsaikhan as Arig

External links 
 
 
 

2007 television films
2007 films
Cultural depictions of Kublai Khan
Cultural depictions of Marco Polo
Films set in the Yuan dynasty
Films set in the 13th century
Films directed by Kevin Connor
Films scored by Ken Thorne